State Legislature is a 2007 American documentary film directed by Frederick Wiseman. It details the workings of the Idaho Legislature. Wiseman filmed for a total of 160 hours over a full 12-week session of the legislature, later editing his content down to a 3 ½ hour film. Wiseman was interested in the topic as a way to show one of the more basic political systems in America at work. It was first broadcast on PBS in June 2007.

References

External links
 
 

Documentary films about American politics
Documentary films about Idaho
Films set in Idaho
Politics of Idaho
American documentary television films
Films directed by Frederick Wiseman
2000s English-language films
2000s American films